Muscatel is a type of wine made from muscat grapes.  The term is now normally used in the United States to refer to a fortified wine made from these grapes rather than just any wine made from these grapes.  This fortified muscatel became popular in the United States when, at the end of prohibition, in order to meet the large demand for wine, some poor strains of muscat grapes (used normally for table grapes or raisins) mixed with sugar and cheap brandy were used to produce what has since become infamous as a wino wine.  This kind of fortified wine has, in the United States, damaged the reputation of all muscat-based wines and the term muscatel tends no longer to be used for these "better" wines in the United States. In other markets the term Muscatel, or Moscatel, refers to a wide range of sweet wines based on these grapes.

In 16th-century Germany elderflower infused Salvia sclarea was added to Rhine wines to make a more potent varietal that was called "Muscatel", giving the plant one of its common names "muscatel sage".

See also 
 Moscatel de Setúbal

References

Fortified wine